Salemiyeh (also Romanized as Sālemīyeh and Salmīyeh; also known as Seh Leyleh and Sulaimāniyeh) is a village in Gazin Rural District, Raghiveh District, Haftgel County, Khuzestan Province, Iran. At the 2006 census, its population was 287, in 57 families.

References 

Populated places in Haftkel County